Two ships of the Royal Australian Navy (RAN) have been named HMAS Westralia:

, a passenger vessel launched in 1929, requisitioned for RAN service as an armed merchant cruiser in 1939, converted into an infantry landing ship in 1943, and returned to her civilian owners in 1951
, a Leaf-class replenishment oiler acquired from the British Royal Fleet Auxiliary in 1989, and decommissioned in 2006

Battle honours
Ships named HMAS Westralia are entitled to carry six battle honours:
Pacific 1941–45
New Guinea 1943–44
Leyte Gulf 1944
Lingayen Gulf 1945
Borneo 1945
Kuwait 1991

See also
 , a passenger liner converted into a troopship and sunk in 1942

References

Royal Australian Navy ship names